Nelida may refer to:

Given name
Nélida María Bacigalupo (1924–2019), Argentine botanist, curator, and professor
Nélida Béjar (born 1979), Spanish composer based in Germany
Nélida Bilbao (1918–1990), Argentine film actress
Nelida Fuccaro, Italian historian and professor
Nélida Fullone (1915–?), Argentine fencer
Nélida Gómez de Navajas (1927–2012), Argentine human rights activist
Nélida Lobato (1934–1982), Argentine dancer, vedette, model and actress
Nelida Milani (born 1939), ethnic Italian writer from Croatia
Nélida Piñon (born 1937), Brazilian author and professor
Nélida Roca (1929–1999), Argentine actresses
Nélida Romero (1926–2015), Argentine actress
Nélida Sifuentes (born 1981), politician and union leader of the indigenous peasant movement in Bolivia
Nélida Sulca (born 1987), Peruvian athlete
Nelida Tirado (born 1971), American flamenco dancer
Nélida Zaitegi (born 1946), Spanish teacher and pedagogue

See also
Atlantagrotis nelida, moth of the family Noctuidae
Nélida, novel by Marie d'Agoult